The following is a list of events and releases that have happened or are expected to happen in 2019 in African music.

Events
 9 January - Nigerian singers Simi and Adekunle Gold marry in a private ceremony. 
 15 April 
Winners of the AfriMusic Song Contest 2019 are announced:
Best English Lyrics: Siboat (Ghana) – "Always and Forever"
Best French Lyrics: Joahn Lover (Cameroon) – "Game Over"
Best African Language Song: Nonzwakazi (South Africa) – "Phakama Mbokodo"
Abdullah Ibrahim is one of four recipients of the NEA Jazz Masters Fellowships celebrated in a concert at the John F. Kennedy Center for the Performing Arts in Washington, DC.
 3 May - Naira Marley is arrested by the Economic and Financial Crimes Commission in Nigeria.
24 June - Burna Boy wins "Best International Act" at the BET Awards 2019.
18 September - After rumours of the death of Majek Fashek are dispelled by his manager, who confirms that Fashek has aesophageal cancer and has been hospitalized at the Queen Elizabeth Hospital, London, UK, philanthropist Femi Otedola pledges to cover all the singer's medical expenses. Fashek would die the following summer.
19 October - Nigerian singer Teni wins the "Best Pop Single" award at The Headies 2019, for "Case".
23 November - Joeboy wins the "Best Artiste in African Pop" award at the All Africa Music Awards.
3 December - Kabza De Small is named by Spotify as the most-streamed South African artist of 2019.

Albums released in 2019

Classical
Robert Fokkens - Duo for violin and cello
Clare Loveday - What Gives for violin and piano

Musical films and film music
Atlantics, with score by Fatima Al Qadiri

Births
October 2 - Diamond Platnumz and his partner Tanasha Donna have their first child, Naseeb Jr.

Deaths
January 5 - Dan Tshanda, 54, South African singer and guitarist of Splash; (heart attack)
January 7 - John Joubert, 91, South African-born composer
January 23 – Oliver Mtukudzi, 66, Zimbabwe musician
February 8 - , 59, Malian composer and singer
March 13 - Joseph Hanson Kwabena Nketia, 97, Ghanaian ethnomusicologist and composer
March 30 – Simaro Lutumba, 81, Congolese musician (TPOK Jazz)
June 2 – Piet Botha, 63, South African rock musician (pancreatic cancer)
July 16 - Johnny Clegg, 66, South African musician (pancreatic cancer)
August 5 – Jimi Hope, 62, Togolese musician and painter.
August 12 – DJ Arafat, 33, Ivorian disc jockey and musician, traffic collision.
October 4 – Elias Melka, 41, Ethiopian record producer and songwriter
November 9 – Taiwo Lijadu, 71, Nigerian singer (Lijadu Sisters)
December 3 – Shaaban Abdel Rahim, 62, Egyptian shaabi singer

See also 
 2019 in music

References 

Africa
African music
2019 in Africa